Angel of Eden is a 2016 Burmese legal-drama film, directed by Mee Pwar starring Sai Sai Kham Leng, Paing Phyo Thu, Mari Cole, Wint Yamone Naing, May Grace and Mya Hnin Yee Lwin. The film, produced by Heart & Soul Picture and Frenzo Production premiered in Myanmar on January 29, 2016.

Cast
Sai Sai Kham Leng as Eden
Paing Phyo Thu as La Min Phyu
Mari Cole as Nat Pan Chi
Wint Yamone Naing as Pan Thit Khet, News Reporter
May Grace as Madi Pyo
Mya Hnin Yee Lwin as Saung Hninsi, Lawyer
Thar Nyi as Saw Thiha
Nay Aung as U Hlaing Bwar
San Htut as Paing Soe, Policeman
Min Min Htun as Jeffery

Notes

References

External links

2016 films
2010s Burmese-language films
Burmese drama films
Films shot in Myanmar